Ratanapol (Thai: รัตนพล) is a Thai given name and surname. Notable people with the name include:

Anat Ratanapol (born 1947), Thai sprinter 
Ratanapol Sor Vorapin (born 1974), Thai professional boxer

Thai-language surnames
Thai given names